Melvin Andrews (born 21 January 1974) is a  football player from Saint Vincent and the Grenadines who currently plays for Hope International FC.

His position is goalkeeper.
He played in Honduras for Club Deportivo Palestino between 1996-1998

Club career
Andrews has also played for North East Stars in the TT Pro League and for Positive Vibes in the  US Virgin Islands Championship.

International career
He also has one of the most appearances  for the Saint Vincent and the Grenadines national football team with 145 appearances. These also include unofficial matches.

External links
 
 
 

1974 births
Living people
Association football goalkeepers
Saint Vincent and the Grenadines footballers
Saint Vincent and the Grenadines international footballers
Saint Vincent and the Grenadines expatriate footballers
Saint Vincent and the Grenadines expatriate sportspeople in Trinidad and Tobago
Expatriate footballers in Trinidad and Tobago
People from Kingstown
TT Pro League players